Catarman, officially the Municipality of Catarman, is a 1st class municipality and capital of the province of Northern Samar, Philippines. According to the 2020 census, it has a population of 97,879 people.

It is the largest municipality in terms of land area and population in the province. It is the commercial, educational, financial, political and government center of the province.

History

Before the coming of the Spaniards, Catarman (also known as Calatman or Cataruman) was a settlement by the mouth of the river of the same name in the region called Ibabao. The Spanish Conquistadores freely applied the name Ibabao to the northern part of Samar island when it established its civil government. The similarities in the vocabularies and pronunciation of the dialects of these areas traces them to a common root as a people.

The town was one of the 13 villages and settlements and adopted as pueblos by the Spaniards in Samar Island and was one of the settlements in the northern parts of the island. The pueblo was named Calatman and was one of the pueblos in the Visayan islands, then collectively referred to as Islas de Pintados.

In 1974, Catarman was made the center of the episcopal see of the then newly established Roman Catholic Diocese of Catarman comprising the Northern Samar province, with the Our Lady of the Annunciation Parish Church as the designated cathedral.

Cityhood

In 2003, its application for cityhood was deterred after officials of the neighboring of towns Bobon and Mondragon opposed the planned Catarman City conglomeration, which was necessary to meet the criteria for the approval of its bid for cityhood. Another bill was filed converting the Municipality of Catarman into a component city of Northern Samar but is still pending with the Committee on Local Government in the House of Representatives since July 2010. The rise of establishments and banking institutions has swiftly came and filled the spaces of Catarman that paved the way for it to become competitive.

Geography

Catarman lies on the northern part of Samar Island, bounded to the east by Mondragon, to the west by Bobon, to the south by Lope de Vega, and to the north by the Philippine Sea.

On the Pacific coast are flat lowlands with the interior characterized by outlying low hills. Mount Puyao in Barangay Liberty is the highest peak in the area. The Catarman River, a major provincial river, divides the eastern and the western parts of the town. It is fed by the Paticua, Hibulwangan, Mahangna, Tura, and Danao creeks together with lesser prominent estuaries.

Barangays
The Municipality of Catarman is politically subdivided into 55 barangays, 17 of them in the poblacion.

Climate

Demographics

Economy

Transportation

There is only one airline operating through the Catarman National Airport (IATA: CRM) coming from and going to Manila: PAL Express. Flights are frequently booked out well in advance and a one way ticket from Manila costs between PhP3,000 and PhP8,000 unless booked well in advance. Pedicabs, commonly known as "padyak" and tricycles are the means of transportation within the town, while multicabs, jeepneys, and vans are the means of transportation to neighboring and distant towns within the province. Several vans and buses companies are also operating from the town going to Manila or Tacloban city and vice versa.

Education
Catarman is home to the University of Eastern Philippines, the first state university in the Visayas and the largest university by student population and curriculum in Eastern Visayas. The university has satellite campuses in the province, one in Laoang and the other in Catubig (officially known the Pedro Rebadulla Memorial Campus), and has several extension programs offered across satellite campuses in the region.

Catarman is also an abode to the top performing schools in the region which already have a name in the National Level.

Other public and private schools (but not limited to):

Elementary:
Catarman Chinese Chamber Elementary School
Catarman I Central School
Catarman II Central School
Catarman III Central School
Baybay Elementary School
Catarman SpEd Center
Cawayan Integrated School
Colegio de San Lorenzo Ruiz de Manila (Elementary)
Northern Samar Colleges (Elementary)
University of Eastern Philippines Laboratory Elementary School

High school:
University of Eastern Philippines Laboratory High School
Colegio de San Lorenzo Ruiz de Manila (Highschool)
Northern Samar Colleges (Highschool)
Saint Michael Academy (Catarman)
Catarman National High School
Eastern Visayas High School (High School)

Tertiary/College/Vocational:

University of Eastern Philippines
Eastern Visayas Central Colleges
Colegio De San Lorenzo Ruiz De Manila
Technical Education and Skills Development Authority (TESDA)
Global School for Technological Studies
East Pacific Computer College
Northern Samar Colleges
Lyceum of the Visayas (Foreclosure)

Notable personalities

Narciso Abuke- Lt. Col. and Area Commander of Northern Samar during the Philippine-American War. Killed Pulahan leader Pedro de la Cruz in 1906. Mayor of Catarman 1912–1916 
Pablo Rebadulla - lawyer and Waray-language poet and musician

References

External links

Philippine Standard Geographic Code
Philippine Census Information
Local Governance Performance Management System

Catarman, Northern Samar
Provincial capitals of the Philippines
Municipalities of Northern Samar